Gangdong-gu Office is a station on Seoul Subway Line 8.

Station layout

Railway stations in South Korea opened in 1999
Seoul Metropolitan Subway stations
Metro stations in Gangdong District